Susan Campbell may refer to:

 Susan Campbell (illustrator and author), British expert on walled kitchen gardens, food writer and illustrator
 Sue Campbell, Baroness Campbell of Loughborough (born 1948), British sports administrator
 Susan M. Campbell (born 1941), American self-help author, relationship coach and seminar leader
 Susan Campbell Bartoletti (born 1958), American writer of children's literature 
 Susan Foreman, a character from Doctor Who
 Susan Goethel Campbell (born 1956), American book artist